William Albert Gissberg (September 17, 1922 – December 30, 2002) was an American politician in the state of Washington. He served in the Washington State Senate from 1953 to 1973.

References

2002 deaths
1922 births
Democratic Party Washington (state) state senators
20th-century American politicians
Politicians from Everett, Washington